Babalı or Babaly may refer to:
 Babalı, Jalilabad, Azerbaijan
 Babalı, Khachmaz, Azerbaijan